The military ranks of Armenia are the military insignia used by the Armed Forces of Armenia. Being a former Soviet Republic, Armenia shares a rank structure similar to that of the Soviet Union. Armenia is a landlocked country, and therefore does not possess a navy.

Commissioned officer ranks
The rank insignia of commissioned officers.

Other ranks
The rank insignia of non-commissioned officers and enlisted personnel.

References

External links